The Changchun–Baicheng railway (Simplified Chinese: 长白铁路) is a double-track electrified railway in China.

History
The line was built by the Japanese in 1934.

Starting in 2014, the railway underwent an upgrade which saw bridges and tunnels built to replace level crossings. The radius of corners was also increased and the line was double-tracked. The refurbished railway was opened in 2017. In 2019, the Fuxing CR200J EMU was introduced on the line.

Stations
The line has the following passenger stations:
Changchun
Kai'an
Huaijia
Nong'an
Halahai
Wangfu
Songyuan
Chaganhu
Changshantun
Da'an
Liangjia
Anguan
Daobao
Baicheng

References

Railway lines in China
Railway lines opened in 1934